GCW Bloodsport is a professional wrestling event held by the American promotion Game Changer Wrestling (GCW). This event consists of a unique ruleset compared to a traditional pro wrestling event, in that every match must end in either a knockout or submission. The traditional wrestling ring is replaced by a ring canvas with no ropes or turnbuckles.

This event features worked shoot matches in a style that mimics the early days of MMA and catch wrestling. It is common for Bloodsport competitors to have some knowledge in other combat sports and/or MMA, as well as professional wrestling, as these one on one matches often appear stiff and have a feel of a classic Shoot-style wrestling fights.

Dates and venues

Events

Matt Riddle's Bloodsport 
Matt Riddle's Bloodsport took place on April 5, 2018, at Pontchartrain Convention & Civic Center in Kenner, Louisiana.

Josh Barnett's Bloodsport
Josh Barnett's Bloodsport took place on April 4, 2019, at White Eagle Hall in Jersey City, New Jersey.

Josh Barnett's Bloodsport 2
Josh Barnett's Bloodsport 2 took place on September 14, 2019, at The Showboat in Atlantic City, New Jersey.

Josh Barnett's Bloodsport 3
Josh Barnett's Bloodsport 3 took place on October 11, 2020, at the Marion Country Fairgrounds Coliseum in Indianapolis, Indiana. The event was held as part of the Collective 2020 weekend.

It was originally scheduled to be held on April 2, 2020, at The Cuban Club in Tampa, Florida, but was postponed due to the COVID-19 pandemic in Florida.

The event included an inaugural Bloodsport Women's Tournament, which was the first professional wrestling tournament to ever be held at a Bloodsport event. The trophy was awarded to Lindsay Snow.

Bloodsport Women's Tournament

Josh Barnett's Bloodsport 4
Josh Barnett's Bloodsport 4 took place on February 13, 2021, at Electric Pony Studios in Los Angeles, California.

Josh Barnett's Bloodsport 5
Josh Barnett's Bloodsport 5 took place on February 20, 2021, at Electric Pony Studios in Los Angeles, California, only a week removed from Bloodsport 4.

Josh Barnett's Bloodsport 6
Josh Barnett's Bloodsport 6 took place on April 8, 2021, at The Cuban Club in Tampa, Florida.

Josh Barnett's Bloodsport 7
Josh Barnett's Bloodsport 7 took place on October 22, 2021, in Los Angeles, California.

Josh Barnett's Bloodsport 8
Josh Barnett's Bloodsport 8 took place on March 31, 2022, in Dallas, Texas.

References

External links

2019 in professional wrestling
Recurring events established in 2018
2018 in professional wrestling
Professional wrestling in New Jersey
Professional wrestling in Louisiana
Events in New Jersey
Events in Louisiana